This page lists untitled noble families, or whose title is unclear, in the territories of the Austro-Hungarian Empire, whether extant or extinct.

Notes

Where this section is blank, it is possible that the preposition is unknown or did not exist.

Untitled nobility